Heinz Jost (9 July 1904 – 12 November 1964) was a German SS functionary during the Nazi era. He was involved in espionage matters as the Sicherheitsdienst (Security Service) or (SD) section chief of office VI (foreign intelligence) of the Reich Security Main Office. Jost was responsible for genocide in eastern Europe as commander of Einsatzgruppe A from March–September 1942. 

After Germany's defeat, Jost was tried and convicted by a U.S. military court at the Einsatzgruppen trial. In December 1951, Jost was released from Landsberg Prison after his sentence was commuted to ten years and died in 1964.

Early life 
Heinz Jost was born in the northern Hessian Homberg (Efze) - Ortsteil Holzhausen - in Hersfeld in 1904, to a middle-class Catholic and nationalistic family. Heinrich Jost, Heinz's father, was a pharmacist and later became a fellow NSDAP member. Jost attended grammar school in Bensheim, graduating in 1923. As a student he became a member, and eventually a leader, of the Jungdeutsche Orden (Young German Order), a nationalistic paramilitary movement. Jost studied law and economics at the Universities of Giessen and Munich. He completed his civil service examination in May 1927. Heinz's legal career began as a legally trained civil servant employed in Hesse. He later worked in the district court at Darmstadt.

Nazi career 
Jost joined the Nazi Party on 2 February 1928 with an NSDAP membership number of 75,946. He performed various functions for the party's operations in southern Hesse. From 1930 he settled as an independent lawyer in Lorsch, Hesse. After the Nazi seizure of power in March 1933, Jost was appointed Director of Police in the city of Worms and then to police director of Giessen. From this period came his association with Werner Best, who brought Jost into the main Nazi intelligence and security agency, the Sicherheitsdienst (SD). On 25 July 1934, Jost began his full-time career with the SD. His SS membership number was 36,243. In May 1936, Jost was promoted in the SD Main Office to head Department III 2 (Foreign Intelligence Services). In 1938, Jost was head of the Einsatzgruppe Dresden which occupied Czechoslovakia. In August 1939 Jost was tasked by Reinhard Heydrich with obtaining the Polish uniforms needed for the false flag attack on the station in Gleiwitz.

When the Reich Security Main Office (RSHA) was established in September 1939, Jost was appointed as chief of Amt VI (Office VI) Ausland-SD (foreign intelligence). One of the chief purposes of Amt VI was to counteract foreign intelligence services that might try to operate in Germany. He also served as an SS officer in the German invasion of Poland in 1939.

Einsatzgruppe command 
Jost's career suffered by being linked with Werner Best, who was a rival of Reinhard Heydrich. Best lost a power struggle with Heydrich who went on to become one of the most powerful men in the Nazi state. In March 1942, Jost was fired from his position as Chief of Ausland-SD. Jost's place was taken by Brigadeführer Walter Schellenberg, a deputy of Heydrich. Heydrich had given Schellenberg the task of building up a case for Jost's removal. According to Schellenberg, Jost was lacking in bureaucratic skill and drive.

Jost was sent to command Einsatzgruppe A, whose previous commander Franz Walter Stahlecker, had recently been killed in a battle with partisans. Einsatzgruppe A was then operating in the Baltic States and in Belarus. Jost became Befehlshaber der Sicherheitspolizei und des SD (Commander of the Security Police and the SD) or BdS in Reichskommissariat Ostland, with his headquarters at Riga. Jost retained this position until September 1942. According to Jost, this position carried substantial responsibility:

During the time the territory under his jurisdiction was subject to army control, Jost as Chief of Einsatzgruppe A cooperated with the army command. When the territory came under civilian administration, he, as Commander in Chief of Security Police and SD received his orders from the Higher SS and Police Leader Friedrich Jeckeln. In both cases Jost was responsible for all operations conducted in his territory.

After his Einsatzgruppen command, Jost was able to secure a position with the occupation administration for the eastern territories that was run by Alfred Rosenberg, where he acted as a liaison officer between Rosenberg and the Wehrmacht commander in southern Russia, Ewald von Kleist. At his later trial, Jost claimed that he held this position until May 1944, when as a result of enmity from Heinrich Himmler, he was forced to enlist with the Waffen-SS as a second lieutenant. Himmler decided in January 1945, that Jost should be retired from the SS with a pension.

Trial and conviction

In April 1945, Jost was arrested in Gardelegen, in Saxony-Anhalt, and was charged by the U.S. military with murders committed by Einsatzgruppe A. 

At trial (the 9th of the twelve, in total, trials convened, known as the Subsequent Nuremberg Trials), Jost tried to avoid responsibility for these crimes, by claiming the murders (or at least some of them) occurred before he came into command of the unit:

This defense was rejected by the tribunal:

Jost also claimed, through his attorney, that whatever he had done was justified by "self-defense, necessity, and national emergency". He further claimed he had nothing to do with carrying out the Führer's order (Führerbefehl) for the extermination of entire populations. These claims were rejected by the tribunal as being inconsistent with each other: "If, as a matter of fact, the defendant committed or approved of no act which could be interpreted either as a war crime or crime against humanity, the argument of self-defense and necessity is entirely superfluous."

Jost did testify that when in May 1942 he received an order from Heydrich to surrender Jews under 16 and over 32 for liquidation, he placed the order in his safe and declined to transmit it. The tribunal found the evidence contradicted him. According to Einsatzgruppen status report number 193, dated 17 April 1942, there was an execution in Kovno [Kaunas], on 7 April 1942, of 22 persons "among them 14 Jews who had spread Communist propaganda".

In addition, the tribunal found, that on 15 June 1942, one of Jost's subordinates wrote to the RSHA, requesting shipment of a gas van (used by the Einsatzgruppen for executions by means of carbon monoxide asphixiation) and gas hoses for three gas vans on hand. Jost denied any knowledge of this letter but admitted that the subordinate in question had the authority to order equipment.

His sentence was reviewed by the "Peck Panel". In December 1951, Jost was released from Landsberg Prison after his sentence commuted to ten years. He then worked in Düsseldorf as a real estate agent. He died in 1964 at Bensheim.

Notes

References 
 Altenhöner, Florian, The Case of Heinz Maria Karl Jost: Ein MI5-Vernehmungsbericht aus dem Jahr 1945, in: Journal for Intelligence, Propaganda and Security Studies 2 (2008) H. 2, S. 55–76.
 Diefenforf, Jeffry M., Frohn, Axel, and Rupieper, Hermann-Josef, American Policy and the Reconstruction of West Germany, 1945–1955, Cambridge University Press, 1994. 
 Doerries, Rienhard R., Hitler's Last Chief of Foreign Intelligence: Allied Interrogations of Walter Schellenberg, Frank Cass, 2007 [2003]. 
   Höhne, Heinz, Der Orden unter dem Totenkopf. München, Goldmann, 1967. 
 Kahn, David, Hitler's Spies—German Military Intelligence in World War II, Da Capo Press, 2000. 
  Krausnick, Helmut, and Wilhelm, Hans-Heinrich, Die Truppe des Weltanschauungskrieges. Stuttgart, DVA, 1981. 
 Trials of War Criminals before the Nuernberg Military Tribunals under Control Council Law No. 10, Nürnberg, October 1946 - April 1949, Volume IV, ("Green Series") (the "Einsatzgruppen case") also available at Mazel library (well indexed HTML version)
 Reitlinger, Gerald, The SS—Alibi of a Nation, Viking (Da Capo reprint), New York, 1957. 
 
  Wildt, Michael, Generation der Unbedingten – Das Führungskorps des Reichssicherheitshauptamtes. Hamburg, Hamburger Edition, 2003.

Further reading 
 Earl, Hilary, The Nuremberg SS-Einsatzgruppen Trial, 1945–1958: Atrocity, Law, and History, Nipissing University, Ontario 
 Headland, Ronald, ''Messages of Murder: A Study of the Reports of the Einsatzgruppen of the Security Police and the Security Service, 1941–1943, Rutherford 1992

External links 
  Biography and photograph of Jost

1904 births
1964 deaths
People from Homberg (Efze)
People from Hesse-Nassau
Nazi Party politicians
Young German Order members
SS-Brigadeführer
Einsatzgruppen personnel
Holocaust perpetrators in Russia
Holocaust perpetrators in Lithuania
People convicted by the United States Nuremberg Military Tribunals
Prisoners sentenced to life imprisonment by the United States military
Holocaust perpetrators in Belarus
Holocaust perpetrators in Latvia
German people convicted of crimes against humanity
Reich Security Main Office personnel